Traffic obstruction is a common tactic used during public protests and demonstrations. The transport users affected by such disruptions are sometimes unsympathetic to the cause.

Legality 
Most jurisdictions consider the obstruction of traffic an illegal activity and have developed rules to prosecute those who block, obstruct, impede, or otherwise interfere with the normal flow of vehicular or pedestrian traffic upon a public street or highway. Some jurisdictions also penalize slow moving vehicle traffic. The unimpeded flow of traffic in the public road-space is often considered a common right.

Examples 
Examples of intentional traffic obstructions aimed to articulate a protest agenda include Extinction Rebellion protests, air traffic controller strike, highway revolts, Critical Mass bicycle rides corking intersections, obstruction of rail transport of nuclear fuel in Germany, road blockades by farmers or truckers in France and other countries, impact on Eurotunnel operations by the Migrant Crisis around Calais, pipeline protests (e.g. Dakota Access Pipeline), etc.

Raasta roko 

Raasta roko (Hindi for obstruct the road) is a form of protest commonly practised in India. It usually involves large numbers of people preventing vehicular traffic from using a busy thoroughfare. Pedestrian traffic is not targeted.

Rail roko is similar blocking of a railway.

See also 
 Highway revolts
 Barricade
 Protest
 Traffic bottleneck

References

Traffic law
Transport reliability
Protest tactics
Anti-road protest
Civil disobedience